Frederic Emil "Fred" Brown (July 9, 1943 – June 27, 2014) was an American attorney, electrical engineer, and politician.

Fred Brown was born in Anchorage, Alaska on July 9, 1943.  He moved with his family to Fairbanks, Alaska while still an infant, where he resided for the remainder of his life. Brown graduated from Lathrop High School. He then received his bachelor's degree from the University of Alaska and his master's degree from Stanford University, both in electrical engineering. In 1969, Brown received his law degree from Columbia University School of Law and practiced law in Fairbanks, Alaska. Brown served in the Alaska House of Representatives from 1975 to 1983 as a Democrat. He was married to Helen Brown. He died in Fairbanks at age 70.

References

External links
 Fred Brown at 100 Years of Alaska's Legislature

1943 births
2014 deaths
Alaska lawyers
American electrical engineers
Columbia Law School alumni
Democratic Party members of the Alaska House of Representatives
Politicians from Anchorage, Alaska
Politicians from Fairbanks, Alaska
Stanford University alumni
University of Alaska Fairbanks alumni
Lawyers from Fairbanks, Alaska
Lawyers from Anchorage, Alaska
20th-century American lawyers